Grown-Up Christmas List is the debut Christmas extended play and the fourth album by Filipino pop and R&B singer Jake Zyrus, released on November 30, 2010 and credited under the name Charice.

Promotion
Jake Zyrus appeared in NBC's Christmas Tree Lighting at Rockefeller Center on November 30, 2010, where he performed "Grown-Up Christmas List" and "Jingle Bell Rock" accompanied by David Foster. He also appeared on Japan’s Mezamashi TV, where he performed "Happy Xmas (War Is Over)".  His promotions also took him to Japan radios where he performed "Happy Xmas (War Is Over)" live on J-Wave.

Track listing

Charts
The song "Happy Xmas (War Is Over)" debuted on Billboard Japan Hot 100 at no. 83.

References

Jake Zyrus albums
2010 Christmas albums
Christmas albums by Filipino artists
Pop Christmas albums
Contemporary R&B Christmas albums
Christmas EPs
2010 EPs
Covers EPs